James Kemper may refer to:

James L. Kemper (1823–1895), American lawyer, Confederate general, and Governor of Virginia
James S. Kemper (1886–1981), American  businessman, philanthropist, and diplomat

See also
Kemper Log House, built by Reverend James Kemper